Lakah may refer to:
 Raymond Lakah
 Lakah, Iran